Kirby Buckets, also known as Kirby Buckets Warped for the third season, is an American comedy television series that aired on Disney XD from October 20, 2014 to February 2, 2017. Although a live-action series, the series also includes animated cartoon sequences of Kirby's drawings. The series stars Jacob Bertrand, Olivia Stuck, Mekai Curtis, Cade Sutton, and Tiffany Espensen.

Series overview

Episodes

Season 1 (2014–15)

Season 2 (2015–16)

Season 3: Warped (2017)

References 

Lists of American children's television series episodes
Lists of American comedy television series episodes
Lists of Disney Channel television series episodes